Gibraltar competed at the inaugural 7 sports 2018 European Championships from 2 to 12 August 2018.

Competitors

Three competitors; Harvey Dixon, Jessy Franco and Arnold Rogers competed in athletics.

Athletics

References

External links
 European Championshipsofficial site 

2018
Nations at the 2018 European Championships
2018 in Gibraltarian sport